The Innkeepers can mean:
 Episode 47/23 of the television series Frasier
 The Innkeepers (film), a horror film written, directed and edited by Ti West

See also 
 Innkeeper